The William James and Edna Cordner House at 440 S. State St. in Orem, Utah was built c.1898.  It has also been known as Planted Earth.  It was listed on the National Register of Historic Places (NRHP) in 1998.

William Cordner, who built the house, was a fruit grower.

See also
Cordner–Calder House, also built by William Cordner, also in Orem and NRHP-listed
Alexander and Nellie P. Cordner House, also in Orem and NRHP-listed

References

Houses on the National Register of Historic Places in Utah
Victorian architecture in Utah
Houses completed in 1898
Houses in Orem, Utah
National Register of Historic Places in Orem, Utah